Jun-seok Andy Lee (born 31 March 1985) is a South Korean politician who served as party leader of the conservative People Power Party.

Lee entered politics as a relatively young member of the Park Geun-hye presidential administration, during which he served as one of the 11-member Grand National Party’s (later renamed Saenuri Party) Executive Leadership Council, the youngest member ever to sit on the Council. After the impeachment of Park in 2016, he left the Saenuri Party and joined the centre-right conservative minor Bareun Party, of which he served as one of the party's Supreme Council members. The Bareun Party would merge into the Bareunmirae Party, and Lee's faction of that party later merged with the majority right-wing conservative Party to form the current People Power Party.

In June 2021, the conservative People Power Party voted to select Lee Jun-seok as its leader, making him the youngest person in South Korean history to lead the main conservative bloc. As leader of the People Power Party, Lee led his party to victory in the 2022 presidential election and the 2022 local elections. He has been noted for his staunch anti-feminism and support from South Korean idaenam.

On 8 July 2022, Lee was given a six month suspension from the People Power Party as the result of a bribery and prostitution scandal. Lee was officially removed from party leadership on 9 August. On 7 October, Lee's party suspension was extended by a year by the party's ethics committee.

Early life 
On 31 March 1985, Jun-Seok Lee was born at Hanyang University Hospital in Seongdong-gu, Seoul, between his father, Su-Wol Lee, previous head of global institutional sales team at Shinhan Bank, and Hyang-Ja Kim, his mother who was a teacher at Andong Girls' High School. During his adolescent years, he lived in a semi-basement house in Sanggye-dong, an impoverished neighbourhood where the housing price was the cheapest. A few years later, his family eventually moved onto a middle-class district Hanshin Village in Sanggye-dong and lived there for ten years. After his father was assigned overseas, he stayed in Singapore and Indonesia for one year. When he returned to Korea, he settled in Mok-dong and graduated from Wolchon Middle School. After graduating from Middle School, he mainly lived in a dormitory due to academic reasons. Now he returned to Sanggye-dong after 20 years. During his time at Seoul Science High School, Lee Jun-Seok served as the vice president of the student council. In March 2003, he was accepted at KAIST as a Math major but withdrew admission right after receiving his Harvard acceptance letter and full-ride presidential science scholarship.

After graduating from Harvard University in 2007, Lee Jun Seok returned to Korea to perform military duties working as a software developer (alternative military service as an industrial technical personnel) at ‘Innotive’, an image browsing software startup, a subsidiary of Nexon. While on the duty, Lee Jun Seok established a non-profit organization called Edushare ‘Society of Sharing Education’ and became its acting representative. After completing his military obligation, Lee Jun Seok prepared to start his own venture. He received funding from the venture startup program backed by the SME (Small & Medium Enterprise) Ministry on 5 August 2011 and founded Classe Studio: an ed-tech startup that developed personalized tutoring software and workplace training applications.

Political career 

Lee Jun Seok had an interview with Park Geun-Hye, the head of Grand National Party’s emergency response committee, who visited ‘Edushare’ in November 2011 for 2 hours. Also, he was introduced as a 「venture entrepreneur in his 20s who graduated from Harvard University」 on 29 December. Then, Lee Jun Seok was recruited to the emergency response committee of the Grand National Party. After being appointed as a member of the emergency response committee, Lee Jun Seok attracted people's attention with his eloquence in debate. He increased his public recognition by appearing on various TV Shows. Then, Lee Jun Seok ran for the election of members of the National Assembly in 2016 in Sanggyeo-dong against Ahn Cheol-Su (the running candidate for Presidential primary), but eventually ended up losing.

Lee Jun Seok was nicknamed as ‘Park Geun-Hye Kid’, but he stood up for the impeachment of President Park Geun-Hye since October 2016. Lee Jun Seok parted ways with Saenuri Party and established a new political party, named Baruen Party with Yoo Seong-min. In 2018, Lee Jun Seok ran for the election of members of the National Assembly, but he lost the election. Before the 21st election of members of the National Assembly, Lee Jun Seok was appointed as a youth supreme representative in Future Unification Party.

After seeing a taxi driver setting fire to himself in the National Assembly, Lee acquired a taxi driver license and worked as a taxi driver for 12 hours daily for two months in March and April of the year 2019.  Even though Lee Jun Seok never won an election, he lived as a political commentator, media host for 10 years, appearing on both entertainment and political TV Shows.

Leader of the People Power Party 
In 2021, Lee Jun Seok ran for the election for selecting the representative of the People Power Party. He became popular among the 20s and 30s due to his opposing stance against political correctness such as "faux feminism," introducing reforms supporting meritocracy rather than outright equality of outcome. Lee Jun Seok lost the partial election in party member vote to candidate Na Kyung-won, but won the main election, recording 43.82 percent (93,390 votes) including votes from the Public Opinion Poll. As a result, Lee Jun Seok was elected as the leader of the People Power Party and he is the youngest to represent the main conservative bloc in Korean political history.

Lee has a negative stance on affirmative action. He is rated as having Idaenam as his main support.

Lee's conflict with Yoon 

On November 29, 2021, Lee posted a facebook post saying "If that is the case, this is it," with another post showing a text emoji of a smiling face and a thumbs-down gesture, and has refused to answer on the phone and has been avoiding the press until December 3.The move is considered to be a protest against Yoon Seok-youl ignoring him as leader of the party.
The feud was resolved by their meeting in Ulsan in December 3.

Ethics investigation, suspension, and ousting 
On 22 April 2022, the People Power Party opened an ethics violation complaint against Lee Jun-seok for an allegation of sexual favors in 2013. Lee denied the allegation and filed a lawsuit against the Youtube Channel that made the allegation. Lee is the first chairman in the history of the country’s main conservative party to be referred to the ethics committee for review while still in office.

On 8 July 2022, the ethics commission of the People Power Party ruled Lee to receive a 6-month suspension of party activities and from his role as party leader. Lee's suspension will end on 8 January 2023. The subject of the committee's deliberation was the alleged attempts of Lee and Kim Cheol-keun, the head of the party’s political affairs office, to destroy evidence. Kim Cheol-keun was handed a two year suspension from party activities for destroying evidence of Lee Jun-seok's accceptance of sexual favors and bribery.

On 9 August, Lee was automatically removed from party leadership. Joo Ho-young took over as interim party leader on the following day.

On 7 October, Lee's suspension was extended by an extra year by the People Power Party's ethics committee.

Criticism 
Lee is considered a moderate conservative within the PPP in most issues, but has attracted controversy due to his stances on some issues. Lee drew strong support from idaenam anti-feminist young men, and Lee has stated that feminism has a totalitarian inclination. Na Kyung-won, a leading female politician in the PPP, described Lee's politics as "Trumpism." Lee Jae-myung, the Democratic Party presidential candidate in the 2022 presidential election, expressed concern about Lee Jun-seok's political popularity, saying, "It could lead to the emergence of far-right populism." South Korean liberal newspaper Hankyoreh also compared Lee Joon-seok to Donald Trump.

Authored books

Election results

General elections

References

External links
 
 
 LinkedIn Public Profile
 TEDxYonsei(3rd) - Junseok Lee - The opportunity of non-profit organization and which way to go 2011.08.31
 Lee Junseok - Naver

Living people
People from Seoul
Businesspeople from Seoul
Businesspeople in computing
Male critics of feminism
Harvard University alumni
South Korean anti-feminists
South Korean businesspeople
1985 births
People Power Party (South Korea) politicians